Duane Pasco (born May 14, 1932) is an American artist.  He is known for his indigenous-style work and as a teacher of Northwest Coast art, in particular as a key contributor to reviving the 'Ksan style.

Pasco was raised in Alaska and Seattle, and is of English and Irish descent. He has been professionally active since his first gallery showing in 1966, working in both carving and two-dimensional formats. In 1967, he took a leave of absence from his then-employment for a steel-construction company, in order to move beyond what he describes as making "curios" and pursue art education full-time.  He again made a major change in approach in 1976. At both these times, he was heavily influenced in his artistic development by the writings and works of artist and historian Bill Holm. He has taught classes at many universities and schools in Washington, British Columbia, and Alaska, notably the Gitanmaax School of Northwest Coast Indian Art ('Ksan), where he influenced artists such as Walter Harris. He is a friend and associate of Nuu-Chah-Nulth artist Joe David.
Pasco is a noted canoe carver, mentoring novice canoe carvers and actively assisting them in the steaming process.

His carved totems are publicly viewable in Seattle at Occidental Park and Seattle Center, and in Sitka, Alaska at Sitka National Historical Park.

He is a speaker and expounder of Chinook Jargon. In the early 1990s he published the bi-monthly Tenas Wawa newsletter in Poulsbo, Washington, where he continues to live.

References

External links
 
 Online display of works by Duane Pasco held at the Stonington Gallery, Pioneer Square, Seattle.

1932 births
Living people
Artists from Alaska
Artists from Seattle
Artists from Washington (state)
Chinook Jargon
Northwest Coast art
Pacific Northwest artists
People from Poulsbo, Washington